Yevgeniy Shikavka (born 15 October 1992) is a Belarusian professional footballer who plays as a centre-forward for Korona Kielce.

References

External links 
 
 

1992 births
Living people
Belarusian footballers
Belarus youth international footballers
Belarus international footballers
Association football midfielders
Belarusian expatriate footballers
Expatriate footballers in Greece
Expatriate footballers in Kazakhstan
Expatriate footballers in Poland
Super League Greece players
I liga players
Ekstraklasa players
FC BATE Borisov players
FC Polotsk players
FC Slonim-2017 players
FC Slavia Mozyr players
FC Krumkachy Minsk players
FC Slutsk players
Athlitiki Enosi Larissa F.C. players
FC Dinamo Minsk players
FC Shakhter Karagandy players
Korona Kielce players
Footballers from Minsk